Bražec is a municipality and village in Karlovy Vary District in the Karlovy Vary Region of the Czech Republic. It has about 200 inhabitants.

Administrative parts
Hamlets of Dolní Valov and Javorná are administrative parts of Bražec.

History
The village was first mentioned in a document from 1289. The municipality was created on 1 January 2016 by diminishing of Military Area Hradiště.

References

Villages in Karlovy Vary District